The 2022 London Broncos season is the 43rd year in the club's history, the third consecutive season out of the Super League and their first season at Plough Lane as tenants of AFC Wimbledon. They were coached by Jermaine Coleman between January and May 2022, and Mike Eccles from May 2022 onwards. The Broncos competed in both the 2022 Betfred Championship and the 2022 Challenge Cup.

Head coach Jermaine Coleman assistant coach Jy-mel Coleman were relieved of their duties by mutual consent in May 2022.

2022 squad

Tables

2022 Betfred Championship table - Regular Season

Results

2022 Betfred Championship

2022 Betfred Challenge Cup

Players making a Broncos debut in 2022

Statistics

Notes

References

External links
London Broncos website
FIXTURES
Rugby League Project - London Broncos - Second Division 2022

London Broncos seasons
London Broncos season
2022 in rugby league by club
2022 in English rugby league